The Sirens of Time is a 1999 audio drama based on the long-running British science fiction television series Doctor Who. It was the first Big Finish Productions audio drama based on the series and became the first in the company's Main Range. The story was written and directed by Nicholas Briggs, and stars Peter Davison, Colin Baker and Sylvester McCoy, who reprise their roles as three incarnations of the Doctor. In the story, the three Doctors team up to defend their home planet of Gallifrey.

The audio drama was recorded in March 1999 and released on CD in July 1999. Davison and Baker were praised for their vocal performances, while the story itself received mixed reception for its format. The story would be followed by over 200 later audio dramas in Big Finish's Main Range, as well as more than twenty other ranges of stories based on Doctor Who, with Davison, Baker and McCoy reprising their roles in subsequent releases.

Plot

Part 1
Vansell, a member of the Celestial Intervention Agency, arrives on Gallifrey with an urgent message for the President of the Time Lords – an invasion fleet threatens the planet and Time Lord technology will not be able to repel them. History has somehow been distorted, and the only clue is the artron energy of a Time Lord in the distortion, which belongs to the Doctor.

The Seventh Doctor hears the cloister bell tolling within the TARDIS and changes the coordinate setting. A message comes through from the Time Lords but is too garbled for the Doctor to make out its content. He then hears a mysterious sound coming from outside the TARDIS, and exits to investigate. He hears a woman, Elenya, drowning in quicksand and rushes to her rescue. He is waylaid by a cackling hag who says both he and Elenya will die. Arriving at the quicksand, the Doctor wonders why the hag had not tried to save Elenya, and takes her back to the TARDIS.

The hag, Ruthley, returns to attend to a crippled old man named Sancroft, her prisoner. Over a communicator, she reports to a commandant who questions her over ion trails he has detected in her sector but she denies knowledge of them. At the TARDIS, the Doctor is not able to enter his ship. He asks Elenya how she arrived on the world. Sensing some familiarity about her he asks if they have met before. Elenya says that she crash landed on the planet. They set out to search for the hag's residence, as another space craft crash lands nearby.

Hearing the crash, Sancroft asks Ruthley if the planet's shields are failing, but she then taunts him that no one is coming to his rescue. The Doctor and Elenya see a ship that somehow makes it through the shields. Ruthley is heard communicating with an alien voice on the ship, which informs her that bio-assassin cultures will activate on landing. The Doctor and Elenya desperately dive for cover as a further ship makes a landing nearby. They arrive at its crash site as something alive emerges. Elenya thinks she is looking at a dying creature, but the Doctor believes the opposite – it is something being born.

Ruthley speaks to a planetary security robot, a Drudger, and commands it to eliminate the Doctor and Elenya, but it tells her that that procedure is not permitted. Ruthley, talking to herself, says that does not matter because all will be dead soon. The Doctor and Elenya come across the robot which commences to do a mind scan which knocks them out. The Doctor awakes to find himself with Sancroft, but Elenya is still unconscious. He is surprised that the Doctor is not afraid of him.

The Drudger reports to Ruthley that it has found bio-engineered life forms emerging from the wreck. The robot confronts the life form and commands it to surrender; its reply is to open fire. Ruthley comes to the cell and tells them they cannot escape, as in the distance they hear the Drudgers being destroyed. Ruthley cackles and tells them that "they" will kill all of them. The Doctor asks if there is anywhere in the house they can all hide, and Sancroft suggests Ruthley's bedroom.

Thinking she has done a deal with them, Ruthley approaches the bio-assassins and tells them that infamous Sancroft, First Knight of Velyshaa, is there for ready them to kill. However, the bio-assassins eliminate her so there will be no witnesses. The bio-assassin plays a recorded message – Sancroft has been sentenced to death for war crimes against the people of Calfadoria. When the Doctor pleads with the assassin to spare their lives, it tells him that it has no quarrel with anyone but Sancroft. However, there must be no witnesses, and the assassin opens fire.

Part 2

A submarine prepares to attack a British freighter as the TARDIS materialises on board. The Fifth Doctor disembarks searching for some sort of distortion. He hears a voice of Time Lord calling to him to return to the TARDIS because of the "destruction of time". However, he is unable to get back inside his craft. A woman arrives and tells him that she will take him to her Captain, just as the submarine starts its attack.

The submarine crew spot two survivors clinging to a box floating in the debris of the remains of the ship. The Doctor and the woman, Helen, are brought on board and a thrown in a cell. The craft submerges as a British destroyer enters the area.

The Doctor demands to see Captain Schweiger with vital information for the Kaiser. The Doctor pretends to be a German spy, telling him that proof of his identity is in an airtight crate now floating in the sea. The Captain is unwilling to retrieve the crate because of the British ships in the area. When returned the cell, the Doctor notices evidence of a time distortion. One of the crew, Schmidt, begins to attack the Doctor and the voice of a Time Lord is heard urging on the attack.

On Gallifrey, Vansell is reprimanded for his brutish plan by the President. However, Vansell insists that the Doctor must be stopped, whatever the cost.
On the submarine, Helen tends to the Doctor's wounds after his fight as the alarms on the craft go off. A vessel, the Aquitania, the Lusitania or the Mauritania, has been sighted, and the submarine prepares to attack it. Vansell telepathically contacts Schmidt and again tells him to kill the Doctor. He goes to the cell with a pistol, and the Doctor tries to reason with him. The observing Time Lords argue over whether to kill the Doctor but Vansell proceeds to give the order to Schmidt to kill, who then shoots.

Schweiger hears the shot and rushes to investigate. The Doctor is still alive, and Helen taking Schmidt's gun shoots and kills the German. The Doctor takes the gun from her, he has only suffered a shoulder wound. He threatens to shoot Schweiger unless he turns the submarine around. Schweiger does not believe the Doctor could shoot him, but Helen takes the gun and displays more determination. Schweiger turns the submarine around and it heads towards the last known position of the TARDIS. The Doctor however is still unable to reunite with his companions inside the TARDIS and realises that the Time Lords wish him to be dead.

Part 3

On Gallifrey, Vansell discovers that a female presence exists inhabiting the vortex at each of the nexus points at which the Doctor has been observed. He has found a further incident involving the Sixth Doctor and the legendary time beast, the Temperon, in the Kurgon system. He pleads with the president for more power, but the President announces that the transduction barriers have been breached and the aliens have landed on Gallifrey. They call themselves the Knights of Velyshaa and have demanded an unconditional surrender.

The Sixth Doctor finds himself at some kind of conference on a space ship where a waitress seems very familiar to him. The ship, the Edifice, is investigating a spatial anomaly known as the Kurgon Wonder. However, a particle field quickly surrounds the ship – the Doctor identifies it as a shard of time distortion. He hears voice saying "help me", but is unable to identify the source. With the exception of the Doctor, a waitress named Elly and an android pilot, everyone on board is aged to death by the disruption.

The Doctor tells Elly he believes the TARDIS has crashed into the Kurgon Wonder. They are attacked by some kind of monster but the pilot arrives and shoots it.
Time distortion begins to make the hull of the ship disintegrate. The Doctor realises that the ship is still heading into the Wonder through momentum. Analysis of the monsters reveals that they are created by accelerated evolution of bacteria and viruses.

On Gallifrey, the Knights shoot dead the President, their technology inhibiting any further regenerations. Vansell is also shot but manages to send a final message through the pilot's positronic brain: "do not free the Temperon."

Elly reveals that she is part of an organisation dedicated to freeing a being they believe is trapped in the Kurgon Wonder. The Doctor deduces from the presences of Temperon particles that the Wonder is in fact the legendary Temperon trapped at the moment of its death. As the pilot is about to relay the Time Lord's message to the Doctor, Elly shoots it. Afterwards, the Doctor finds himself back in the TARDIS at the centre of the Wonder. The Doctor attempts to dematerialise which will also free the Temperon. The Temperon tells the Doctor that he has released the Knights of Velyshaa. As the Doctor is smothered by the Temperon it issues a final warning: "Beware the Sirens of Time."

Part 4

The Temperon absorbs the Doctor into itself and continues its warning about the Sirens of Time. Deposited on Gallifrey, he finds himself in the Panopticon alongside his fifth and seventh incarnations, also brought by the Temperon. They enter contact to share their experiences. They realise the girl each of them encountered was in fact the same person.

One of the Knights of Velyshaa welcomes Knight Commander Lyena to Gallifrey in the name of Sancroff. They detect Time Lord life signs and force the Doctors to flee. Escaping into the lower parts of Capitol, they start to search for the Temperon.

The Sixth and Seventh Doctors observe a Knight out of its armour, its flesh is rotted and diseased. Soon they find the restrained Temperon, but are captured by the Knights. All three Doctors are brought before Lyena who reveals that subjugated Time Lords are being used to revitalise the Knights.

She proceeds to reveal what happened next at each of the nexus points. The Seventh Doctor rerouted the planetary shields to repel the bio-assassins and save Sancroff. The Knights one day found him to inspire their plans of conquest. The Fifth Doctor's actions prevented the sinking of the Lusitania. Although the outcome of the First World War was not greatly affected, a common criminal on board the ship who should have died went on to murder Alexander Fleming. Penicillin was never discovered and in 1956 a plague devastated the Earth. This in turn prevented future humans from defeating the Knights of Velyshaa in battle. When the Sixth Doctor freed the Temperon, its destruction allowed the Knights to gain the powers of Time Travel.

However, Lyena pleads with the Doctor to return in time and reverse all the changes. It seems that the destruction of the Temperon caused a disease which affected all the Knights. The last remaining TARDIS on Gallifrey is too damaged to allow them to use it. When they suggest they should release the Temperon, Lyena immediately refuses and orders the Doctors be arrested. The Temperon warns the Doctors to beware the Sirens of Time, and to beware Lyena.

Grabbing a weapon from a Knight guard, they use it to release the Temperon from its restraints. It tells the Doctors that Elenya, Helen, Ellie and Lyena are all the same, manifestations of the Sirens of Time – a race that feeds on the energies of chaos, distortions and disruptions in time. Unable to disrupt directly, they lure others to do so. If the Doctors obey the Sirens' call more than once, they will be forever trapped in their thrall, but Lyena threatens to kill the Fifth Doctor if they disobey her. The Temperon tells the Doctors if they free it, it will go back in time and destroy the Sirens at the beginning of time. However, they realise he cannot destroy the Sirens or he would have already done so. The Temperon admits this, but he could contain them.

Renewing her threat to kill the Fifth Doctor, the Sixth Doctor uses his pragmatism to see through the threat and releases the Temperon. Sancroff is killed by a bio-assassin, the Lusitania is destroyed by the German submarine. Vansell's TARDIS arrives on Gallifrey but nothing is out of the ordinary, and he departs.

The Doctors arrive at the nexus point where the Seventh Doctor met Elenya for the first time, but ignore her cries for help. They see the hag Ruthley but tell her they were never there. The Doctors then depart, each to try to find their own TARDISes.

Cast

 Peter Davison as the Doctor. Davison previously played this role on television from 1982 to 1984.
 Colin Baker as the Doctor. Baker previously played this role on television from 1984 to 1986.
 Sylvester McCoy as the Doctor. McCoy previously played this role on television from 1987 to 1989.
 Nicholas Briggs as the Temperon and Drudgers.
 Andrew Fettes as Commander Radleth and Schmidt.
 Mark Gatiss as Captain Schwieger, Captain, and Knight 2.
 Anthony Keetch as Coordinator Vansell.
 Colin McIntyre as Sancroff.
 Sarah Mowat as Knight Commander Lyena. Mowat is introduced in each episode of the story as a separate character, but in the story's conclusion it is revealed that they are each manifestations of the titular Sirens of Time.
 Nicholas Pegg as Delegate.
 Maggie Stables as Ruthley.
 Michael Wade as the President.
 John Wadmore as Commandant, Lt Zentner, Pilot Azimendah, and Sub-Commander Solanec.

Production
The Sirens of Time was the first Doctor Who audio produced by Big Finish Productions, and formed the beginning of their Main Range of Doctor Who stories. The BBC granted Big Finish a license to produce original audio stories in 1999. Doctor Who hadn't been on the air since the 1996 American TV film failed to create a new series of the show. It had been ten years since the show was originally cancelled in 1989, and the show wouldn't return to television until 2005. Big Finish did not have the rights to use the Eighth Doctor from the recent film at this point, so the story only consisted of iterations of the Doctor who had appeared in the BBC series.

The Sirens of Time was recorded on the 6th and 7th of March 1999 in Crosstown Studios in London. Nicholas Briggs was both the writer and director of the story, as well as providing the music and sound design.

Release

To coincide with the release of the new Doctor Who range, a CD was given away free in June 1999 with Doctor Who Magazine #279. Titled Talking 'Bout My Regeneration, this documentary considered the history of the show in audio and featured behind the scenes interviews with the cast and production crew.

The Sirens of Time was released on CD in July 1999. A 25-minute preview of the play was also released as a free download to readers of Doctor Who Magazine.

In March 2021, coinciding with the end of The Monthly Adventures, Big Finish made The Sirens of Time available to download for free. This was part of a promotion called #lockdownloads, as the United Kingdom was in lockdown due to the COVID-19 pandemic.

Reception

As the first audio drama released by Big Finish, The Sirens of Time has been received as flawed but with signs of what Big Finish would achieve with later releases.

Writing for FanSided website "Winter Is Coming", James Aggas noted that the story's format differs from other Doctor Who stories involving multiple versions of the Doctor. By having each version of the Doctor feature in their own story, only to meet for the conclusion in the final episode, this created problems of inconsistency between the four episodes. The tone of the first episode, featuring McCoy interacting with larger-than-life characters, differs from that of the second and third, which were much more grounded. Reviewers agree that the first episode has the weakest script of the three, and McCoy's character suffers as a result. The story was seen to suffer somewhat from the format, as each episode lasts only 30 minutes and the script struggles to fit a full story inside each of them, and the "meat" of the story doesn't begin until the final episode.

The vocal performances were praised, particularly those of Davison and Baker. The interactions between the three Doctors in the final episode was also a high point because of the chemistry between the actors. Mowat shows range in her vocal performance as she plays ostensibly different characters in each episode, only revealed to be the same character in the story's conclusion.

References

External links
Big Finish – 001. Doctor Who: The Sirens of Time

Fifth Doctor audio plays
Sixth Doctor audio plays
Seventh Doctor audio plays
Doctor Who multi-Doctor stories
1999 audio plays
Gallifrey audio plays
Audio plays by Nicholas Briggs